"Strikebreaker" is a science fiction short story by American writer Isaac Asimov.  It was first published in the January 1957 issue of The Original Science Fiction Stories under the title "Male Strikebreaker" and reprinted in the 1969 collection Nightfall and Other Stories under the original title "Strikebreaker".  Asimov has stated the editorial decision to run the story as "Male Strikebreaker" "represents my personal record for stupid title changes".

"Strikebreaker" had its genesis in June 1956 when Asimov, who then lived in Boston, Massachusetts, was planning a trip to New York City.  A group of some three dozen technicians was threatening to go on strike, which would have the effect of shutting down the New York subway system. The threatened strike did not happen, and Asimov was able to make the trip, but the situation inspired him to write a story about a strike by a single man that would shut down an entire world.

Plot summary
The world of Elsevere is an extrasolar planetoid a hundred miles in diameter. It is home to an insular, idiosyncratic human colony of thirty thousand people, who have inhabited the planet in all three dimensions.  A rigid caste system has developed, with each occupation being confined to a particular set of families. A visiting Earth sociologist, Steven Lamorak, learns that Igor Ragusnik has gone on strike.

The Ragusnik family operates Elsevere's waste processing facility, and over the generations, the Ragusniks have become a one-family caste of untouchables, forbidden all contact with the rest of the colony. Igor Ragusnik demands that his family's isolation end. Elsevere's ruling council refuses his demands, and if the strike continues, the planetoid's waste processing machinery will break down and every colonist will die from disease. Although the machinery is not difficult to operate, the taboo is so strong that no other Elseverean will do so.

Only Lamorak is willing to speak to Ragusnik. As neither side will give in, he reluctantly volunteers to operate the waste processing machinery himself; as an outsider, he has no cultural compunctions against doing so. Realizing that the ruling council can always import a strikebreaker, Ragusnik capitulates and returns to work.

Lamorak assures Ragusnik that now that other Elseverians and the rest of the galaxy are aware of how unhappy he is, they will eventually end his family's isolation; Ragusnik is unimpressed. Lamorak learns that he must leave immediately, as other Elseverians will no longer have anything to do with him. Now that he has worked at Ragusnik's job, he is an untouchable himself.

References

External links 
 

Short stories by Isaac Asimov
1957 short stories
Works originally published in Future Science Fiction and Science Fiction Stories